Meade may refer to:

Geographic placenames 
 Meade Glacier, Washington, US
 Meade Island, Western Australia
 Meade River, Alaska, US

Populated places or administrative divisions 
 Meade, Kansas
 Meade, Ohio
 Meade County, Kansas
 Meade County, Kentucky
 Meade County, South Dakota
 Meade Township, Huron County, Michigan
 Meade Township, Mason County, Michigan

Other uses 
 Meade (surname), people with the surname Meade
 Meade Instruments, a company that manufactures telescopes and other astronomy accessories
 Meade Senior High School, a high school in Fort Meade, Maryland
 Meade Stadium, of the University of Rhode Island in Kingston, Rhode Island

See also
 Mead (disambiguation) 
 Meades (disambiguation)
 Meads (disambiguation)
 Mede (disambiguation)
 Medes (disambiguation)